Guillén or Guillen is a Spanish or French surname. Notable people with the surname include:

 Alanis Guillen (born 1998), Brazilian actress.
 Ambrosio Guillen (1929–1953), United States Marine who was posthumously awarded the Medal of Honor
 Carlos Guillén, retired Venezuelan baseball player
 Charlie Guillen, American writer and filmmaker
 Fernando Guillén (disambiguation), multiple people
 Harvey Guillén (born 1990), actor
 Jorge Guillén, Spanish poet
 José Guillén (born 1976), Dominican baseball player
 Laurice Guillén (born 1947), Filipina actress
 Montserrat Guillén (born 1964), Spanish statistician and economist
 Nancy Guillén (born 1976), retired Salvadoran hammer thrower
 Néstor Guillén Olmos (1890–1966), President of Bolivia for 27 days
 Nicolás Guillén, Afro-Cuban poet
 Ozzie Guillén (born 1964), Venezuelan baseball coach and former player
 Osiel Cárdenas Guillén (born 1967), Mexican drug lord
 Rafael Guillen ("Subcomandante Marcos"), spokesman for the Zapatista Army of National Liberation
 Ricardo Guillén (born 1967), Spanish basketball player
 Sammy Guillen (1924–2013), West Indian and New Zealand cricket player
 Tonatiuh Guillén López, Mexican academic and government official, Mexico's immigration chief since December 2018
 Vanessa Guillen, American soldier
 Walter Guillén Soto, Catholic bishop in Honduras 

Spanish-language surnames